HMS Hecla was the lead ship of the , an oceangoing survey ship type in the Royal Navy. A fourth ship, was completed in the early 1970s. Hecla was sold to private interests, being renamed "Bligh" after Vice-Admiral William Bligh. After this, the vessel was used in a hydrographic survey of Irish waters, and was based in Waterford, Ireland.

Design and construction
She was laid down at Yarrow Shipbuilders' Blythswood, Glasgow shipyard on 6 May 1964, was launched on 21 December 1964 and was commissioned on 9 September 1965. She had the pennant number A133.

Displacement was  light and  full load, with a gross tonnage of 2,898. The ship had a complement of 127 officers and other ranks. She was fitted with a hangar and helideck aft to allow operation of a single Westland Wasp helicopter, while two surveying launches were carried.

Service
In 1982, Hecla was used as an ambulance ship for the duration of the Falklands War. In this role, she ferried wounded from both sides to the main hospital ship, .

References

External links
 MaritimeQuest HMS Hecla A-133 pages

1964 ships
Ships built on the River Clyde
Hecla-class survey vessels
Falklands War naval ships of the United Kingdom
Hospital ships of the Royal Navy
Hospital ships during the Falklands War